Subacute cutaneous lupus erythematosus  is a clinically distinct subset of cases of lupus erythematosus that is most often present in white women aged 15 to 40, consisting of skin lesions that are scaly and evolve as poly-cyclic annular lesions or plaques similar to those of plaque psoriasis.

Characteristically the lesions appear in sun-exposed areas such as the vee of the neckline or the forearms, but not the face. It may be brought on by sun-sensitizing medications, but is usually associated with autoimmune disorders such as rheumatoid arthritis and Sjögren's syndrome.

Therapy generally involves sun avoidance and protection and topical corticosteroids. Sometimes systemic drug treatment is necessary. Besides corticosteroids other immunosuppressants such as methotrexate are also used.

Lesions of SCLE may have an annular (shaped like a ring) configuration, with raised red borders and central clearing.

See also 
 Lupus erythematosus
 List of cutaneous conditions
 List of human leukocyte antigen alleles associated with cutaneous conditions

References

External links 

Cutaneous lupus erythematosus